Thomas Penruddock (c. 1578 – 1637) was an English politician.

He was a Member (MP) of the Parliament of England for Downton in 1601 and Cumberland 1614.

In John Aubrey's Brief Lives a fragment about Penruddock states that "(It was a) capital (offence) for a native Irishman to come to Dublin without a passe. Sir . . . espying . . . went into the corne . . . found him and hung him up immediately", the source being given as "Mr Anderson", with a note saying that this was a fragment on the "severity of the penal laws", and Mr Anderson was an informant on Irish matters in the life of Richard Boyle, Earl of Cork.

References

1570s births
1637 deaths
English MPs 1601
English MPs 1614